The King Sabata Dalindyebo Local Municipality council consists of seventy-three members elected by mixed-member proportional representation. Thirty-seven councillors are elected by first-past-the-post voting in thirty-seven wards, while the remaining thirty-six are chosen from party lists so that the total number of party representatives is proportional to the number of votes received. In the election of 1 November 2021 the African National Congress (ANC) won a majority of forty-eight seats.

Results 
The following table shows the composition of the council after past elections.

December 2000 election

The following table shows the results of the 2000 election.

March 2006 election

The following table shows the results of the 2006 election.

May 2011 election

The following table shows the results of the 2011 election.

August 2016 election

The following table shows the results of the 2016 election.

November 2021 election

The following table shows the results of the 2021 election.

By-elections from November 2021
The following by-elections were held to fill vacant ward seats in the period from November 2021. In ward seven, a by-election was held in October 2022 after the death of the previous councillor, with the African National Congress retaining its seat. The Economic Freedom Fighters, with 19%, took second spot from the United Democratic Movement, which dropped from 18% to 3%. Turnout was an exceptionally low 17%, with only 3% of registered voters in the Mthatha City district voting.

References

King Sabata Dalindyebo
Elections in the Eastern Cape
elections